Reason for the Season is the third solo studio album by American musician Mike Love, co-founder of The Beach Boys. It was released on October 26, 2018. The album contains traditional Christmas carols, new songs, and re-recordings of "Little St. Nick" (from The Beach Boys' Christmas Album) and "Alone on Christmas Day", an unreleased song recorded by The Beach Boys in 1977. The album was released on compact disc and clear vinyl with red and green splatter.

The album was primarily recorded in Love's home studio on Lake Tahoe in the Sierra Nevada Mountains. It features Love's children — Ambha, Brian, Christian and Hayleigh — who provide choral voices on five tracks, and his sister Maureen as the harpist on "O Holy Night". It also features a guest appearance by Hanson on "Finally It's Christmas", the title track to their 2017 Christmas album. Earlier in 2018, Love collaborated with Hanson on a re-recording of The Beach Boys' "It's OK". Hanson also recorded "Little St. Nick" for their 1997 Christmas album, Snowed In.

The cover photo of the Aurora Borealis was taken by Brian Love off an island in Norway. The back cover features a photo of Mike Love as a child playing with Lionel Trains under a Christmas tree.

Love released music videos for the title track and "Finally It's Christmas".

The album reached #4 on Billboards Holiday Album Chart and #6 on the Independent Albums Chart. Kevin Coffey of the Omaha World-Herald included it in his list of the best new Christmas music of 2018.

Love and Bruce Johnston’s Beach Boys touring band performed tracks from this album during their 2018, 2019, 2021 & 2022 holiday tours.

Track listing

Personnel
Mike Love – vocals
Bruce Johnston – backing vocals
Scott Totten – guitar, percussion, backing vocals
Jeffrey Foskett – rhythm guitar, vocals
John Cowsill – drums
Pete Min – 12-string guitar
Jebin Bruni – keyboards
Maureen Love – harp
Kaveh Rastegar – drums
Michael Lloyd – bass guitar, drums, guitar, harp, backing vocals
Brian Eichenberger – bass guitar, backing vocals
Tim Bonhomme – keyboards, piano
Abe Rounds – drums
Josh Edmondson – guitar
Randy Leago – saxophone, flute
Keith Hubacher – bass guitar
Christian Love – lead and backing vocals
Brian Love – lead and backing vocals
Hayleigh Love – lead and backing vocals
Ambha Love – lead and backing vocals
Hanson – backing vocals on "Finally It's Christmas"
Matthew Jordan – arrangements, backing vocals, keyboards

References

2018 Christmas albums
Mike Love albums
Pop rock Christmas albums
Christmas albums by American artists
BMG Rights Management albums
Albums produced by Michael Lloyd (music producer)
Albums produced by Scott Totten